Ancient Chinese states were typified by variously sized city-states and territories that existed in China prior to its unification by Qin Shi Huang in 221 BCE. In many cases these were dynastic vassal states and fiefs established in the fengjian system characterized by tributes paid to the ruling Zhou dynasty (1046–256 BCE). Such states and fiefs would again emerge during later dynasties as a political expedient when required. Rulers of these states were known as zhuhou.

Background
According to the sinocentric viewpoint and the Mandate of Heaven, China was the center of the world and the incumbent emperor its only ruler; all other would-be potentates and rulers were merely vassals of the Middle Kingdom. As a result, from the earliest times the Chinese viewed the world as a series of concentric spheres of influence emanating outward from their capital. Within the closest circle lay the vassal states who pledged allegiance to the Zhou ruler. Apart from the Zhou dynasty itself, which occupied territory around its capital, each state bore the suffix -guó (/) meaning state (nowadays also "nation"). Of the 150 or so states, some were little more than a small fortified town or city, and others had a capital and other urban areas, controlling significant amounts of territory.

History

Western Zhou 
Following the overthrow of the Shang dynasty in 1046 BCE, the early kings made hereditary land grants to various relatives and descendants. These enfeoffments were accompanied by a title according to the Five Orders of Nobility (五等爵位){{NoteTag|The Five Orders of Nobility and their rough equivalents in the British Peerage were Duke or Gōng (公), Marquess or Hóu (侯), Count or Bó (伯), Viscount or Zĭ (子) and Baron or Nán (男).}}, with only the Zhou ruler bearing the title of "King" (wáng). Along with the land and title came a responsibility to support the Zhou king during an emergency and to pay ritual homage to the Zhou ancestors. In the Yellow River Valley, of the earliest vassal states, the State of Cai was founded following a grant of land by the first Zhou King to his younger brother. Other states founded at this time included Cao, Yan, Jin, and Chen. The central State of Song was created as a land grant to the nobility of the defeated Shang dynasty. On the periphery, the states of Yan, Qi, and Jin in the north and northeast had more room to expand and grew into large states.  In the south, Xiong Yi was granted the fiefdom of Chu, which grew powerful and its later rulers declared themselves kings.  At this time, states (such as Yue) that were considered not as civilized were not eligible for vassaldom. p. 39  Around the borders of the main states lay many smaller entities which over time would be absorbed by their larger neighbors.

Spring and Autumn period

After an attack by Quanrong nomads allied with several vassal states including Shen and Zheng, the Zhou ruler King You was killed in his palace at Haojing. His son fled east and was enthroned by several vassal leaders as King Ping of Zhou. Thus began the Eastern Zhou Dynasty when a new capital constructed a capital at Luoyi (雒邑), modern day Luoyang. Since territory around the city was restricted because other states including Han and Wei were already established in the area, it was impossible for the Zhou to expand their territory, a factor that became increasingly important as a survival mechanism for smaller states. New states continued to emerge whilst Chu was by this stage a powerful southern vassal, having shaken off its former “barbaric” image, as was Qin in the West.

Between the seventh and sixth centuries a four-way balance of power emerged between Qin (west), Jin (west-center), Chu (south) and Qi (east) whilst a number of smaller states continued to exist between Jin and Qi. The State of Deng was overthrown by Chu in 678 BCE followed by Qin’s annexation of State of Hua in 627 BCE, establishing a pattern that would gradually see all smaller states eliminated.  Towards the end of the Spring and Autumn Period wars between states became increasingly common and a pattern of alliances developed amongst the more powerful rulers.

Hegemons

As the power of the Zhou kings weakened, the Spring and Autumn period saw the emergence of hegemons who held power over all other vassal states to raise armies and attack mutual enemies. 
Meetings were also held between the current hegemon and the rulers of the vassal states where ritual ceremonies took place that included swearing of oaths of allegiance to the current Zhou king and each other .

Warring States period

In 704 BCE, Chu state's leader Xiong Tong (熊通) was the first vassal ruler to declare himself equal to the Zhou kings when he proclaimed himself king and later received the posthumous name Wu (武). All the other states gradually followed suit until Zhou rule finally collapsed in 256 BCE. States continued to emerge as in the case of Zhongshan in the north, which was established by the nomadic Bai Di (白翟) in the 5th century BCE and would last until 295 BCE.

By about 300 BCE, only seven main states remained: Chu, Han, Qi, Qin, Yan, Wei and Zhao. Some of these built rammed earth walls along their frontiers to protect themselves both from the other states and raids by nomadic tribes like the Quanrong and Xiongnu. Smaller states like Zheng and Song were absorbed by their more powerful neighbors. The “non-Chinese” states of Ba and Shu were both conquered by Qin by 316 BCE.

Qin Empire
Following his unification of China in 221 BCE, the first emperor Qin Shi Huang eliminated noble titles which did not conform to his legalist system of government; one that believed in merit rather than the privileges of birth. He forced all the vassal leaders to attend the capital where he seized their states and turned them into administrative districts classified as either commanderies or counties depending on their size. The officials who ran the new districts were selected on merit rather than by family connections.

Han dynasty
In the early years of the Han dynasty, the commanderies established during the Qin Dynasty once more became vassal states in all but name. Emperor Gaozu (r. 202–195) granted virtually autonomous territories to his relatives and a few generals with military prowess. Over time these vassal states grew powerful and presented a threat to the ruler. Eventually, during the reign of Emperor Jing (r. 156–141 BCE), his political advisor Chao Cuo recommended the abolition of all fiefdoms, a policy that led in 154 BCE to the Rebellion of the Seven States. The Prince of Wu Liu Bi (劉濞) revolted first and was followed by the rulers of six further states. The rebellion continued for three months until it was finally quelled. Later, Emperor Wu further weakened the power of the vassal states by eliminating many fiefdoms and restoring central control over their prefectures and counties.

See also
 Family tree of ancient Chinese emperors
 Fengjian Chinese nobility
 Fanzhen''
 Spring and Autumn period
 Warring States period
 Eighteen Kingdoms
 Kings of the Han dynasty

Notes

References

External links

 
.States
Former administrative divisions of China
Former vassal states
Political geography
Zhou dynasty